AM-905 (part of the AM cannabinoid series) is an analgesic drug which is a cannabinoid agonist. It is conformationally restricted by virtue of the double bond on its side chain, leading an increased affinity for and selectivity between CB1 and CB2 receptors. It is a potent and reasonably selective agonist for the CB1 cannabinoid receptor, with a Ki of 1.2 nM at CB1 and 5.3 nM at CB2.

See also 
 AM-906 - The corresponding Z or cis isomer
 HU-243 - Double bond replaced by geminal methyls for Thorpe–Ingold effect

References 

Benzochromenes
Primary alcohols
Phenols
AM cannabinoids